The Cuban high-crested toad (Peltophryne gundlachi), or Gundlach's Caribbean toad, is a species of toad in the family Bufonidae that is endemic to Cuba. It is found plains in all provinces as well as Isla de la Juventud and the Sabana-Camagüey Archipelago. The specific name gundlachi honors Johannes Christoph Gundlach, a German zoologist. Its natural habitats are primarily forests but also xeric and mesic grasslands. It is an explosive breeder of rain-flooded pools. It is threatened by habitat loss and degradation caused by agriculture, and by agricultural pollution. Its habitat is also threatened by the invasive tree Dichrostachys cinerea.

References

gundlachi
Endemic fauna of Cuba
Amphibians of Cuba
Amphibians described in 1959
Taxonomy articles created by Polbot